Mirabad-e Chah-e Malek (also Romanized as Mīrābād-e Chāh-e Malek; also known as Mīrābād) is a village in Rigan Rural District, in the Central District of Rigan County, Kerman Province, Iran. At the 2006 census, its population was 83, in 21 families.

References 

Populated places in Rigan County